Gang War in Naples is a 1972 crime film written and directed by Pasquale Squitieri.

Cast
Fabio Testi: Tonino Russo
Raymond Pellegrin: Don Mario Capece
Jean Seberg: Luisa
Enzo Cannavale: Nicola Cafiero "Sciancato"
Ugo D'Alessio: Pietro Russo, padre di Tonino
Lilla Brignone: madre di Tonino
Germana Carnacina: Anna 
Charles Vanel: Don Domenico De Ritis
Enzo Turco: Don Silverio
Salvatore Puntillo: il commissario Capezzuto
Renato Chiantoni: Agostino 
Paul Muller: l'onorevole

Production
Gang War in Naples was director Pasquale Squitieri's fourth film after directing three spaghetti Westerns. Fabio Testi was cast in the film as Tonino Russo after Squitieri saw him in Le Tueur with Jean Gabin. Squitieri went to Paris to meet him despite his producers wanting to cast Massimo Ranieri and Martin Balsam for the roles. Squitieri explained that he "didn't have anything against those actors, but I needed someone who would scare the audience when he came on the screen, and Fabio Testi, with his imposing physique, was just perfect." Squitieri also cast Raymond Pellegrin, noting that Pellegrin "was my idol, he starred in a movie I adore, André Cayatte's Are We All Murderers?." Squiteri also declared casting Jean Seberg was easy as she was Testi's girlfriend at the time.

The film was shot at Incir-De Paolis in Rome and on location in Naples.

Release
Gang War in Naples was distributed theatrically in Italy by Titanus on 24 August 1972. The film grossed a total of 1,345,608,000 Italian lire domestically. Film historian and critic Roberto Curti described the box office success of the film in Italy was to the Camorra what The Godfather was to film on the Sicilian mafia".

It was distributed in France on 30 August 1972 with a 100-minute running time as Les tueurs a gages.

References

Sources

External links

1972 films
Films about the Camorra
Films directed by Pasquale Squitieri
Films scored by Manuel De Sica
1972 crime drama films
Italian crime drama films
French crime drama films
Films set in Naples
Films shot in Naples
1970s Italian films
1970s French films